Cristian Constantin Petre (born 22 March 1979 in Oradea) is a Romanian former rugby union player and current coach.

He won 92 caps for the Romania national rugby union team, with 6 tries scored, 30 points in aggregate. Petre played in all the four games for his country at the 2007 Rugby World Cup.

Honours
Romania
European Nations Cup (2): 2002, 2006

Notes

External links

1979 births
Living people
Sportspeople from Oradea
Romanian rugby union players
Rugby union locks
CS Universitatea Cluj-Napoca (rugby union) players
Racing 92 players
Tarbes Pyrénées Rugby players
CA Brive players
AS Béziers Hérault players
RCJ Farul Constanța players
Barbarian F.C. players
Romania international rugby union players
Romanian expatriate rugby union players
Expatriate rugby union players in France
Romanian expatriate sportspeople in France